Borowo may refer to the following places:
Borowo, Lipno County in Kuyavian-Pomeranian Voivodeship (north-central Poland)
Borowo, Gmina Bytoń in Kuyavian-Pomeranian Voivodeship (north-central Poland)
Borowo, Gmina Dobre in Kuyavian-Pomeranian Voivodeship (north-central Poland)
Borowo, Rypin County in Kuyavian-Pomeranian Voivodeship (north-central Poland)
Borowo, Lublin Voivodeship (east Poland)
Borowo, Lipsko County in Masovian Voivodeship (east-central Poland)
Borowo, Płock County in Masovian Voivodeship (east-central Poland)
Borowo, Sierpc County in Masovian Voivodeship (east-central Poland)
Borowo, Chodzież County in Greater Poland Voivodeship (west-central Poland)
Borowo, Konin County in Greater Poland Voivodeship (west-central Poland)
Borowo, Kościan County in Greater Poland Voivodeship (west-central Poland)
Borowo, Środa Wielkopolska County in Greater Poland Voivodeship (west-central Poland)
Borowo, Kartuzy County in Pomeranian Voivodeship (north Poland)
Borowo, Wejherowo County in Pomeranian Voivodeship (north Poland)
Borowo, West Pomeranian Voivodeship (north-west Poland)